Steinbach Credit Union (SCU) is a Canadian co-operative financial institution and formerly the country's largest single branch credit union.  Founded in 1941, is one of the largest credit unions, by total assets, in the province of Manitoba and among the top 10 in Canada.  By March 2015, SCU had assets of CAD4.25 billion and a membership base of over 91,000. SCU's total assets reached $5.45 billion in December 2017. As of 2022, its assets now exceed $8 billion and membership is approximately 100,000.

The main branch and head offices of SCU are located in Steinbach, Manitoba.  The credit union has branches in southwest and east Winnipeg, which opened in 2003 and 2010, respectively.

Locations

Awards 

|-
| 2010
| eroWORKS - Retail Banking System: Steinbach Credit Union
| Project of the Year - PMI Manitoba Chapter
| 
|-
| 2010
| SignEx with Steinbach Credit Union
| Award of Merit: Unusual/Unique Displays - Cosac Awards
| 
|-

External links

References

Credit unions of Manitoba
Banks established in 1941
Companies based in Manitoba
Steinbach, Manitoba
1941 establishments in Manitoba